Never Again as Before is a 2005 Italian coming of age drama film produced, written and directed by Giacomo Campiotti.

The film was nominated for the David of the Youth at the 2006 David di Donatello Awards, while the theme song "Warriors of Light/Sei o non sei dei" was nominated for Silver Ribbon for best song.

Plot
Six schoolmates, after the high school exams, decide to leave together for a holiday in the Dolomites, in what will probably be their last summer together before they probably never see each other again. The group consists of Enrico, the creator of the holiday and the group's glue; Max, a disabled boy suffocated by oppressive parents; Lorenzo, a musician who dreams the fame; Giulia, Lorenzo's girlfriend, reluctant to leave; Martina, the other girl in the group, secretly in love with Lorenzo; Cesare, an extravagant boy with a punk style and rough, but with a gold heart.

The six during the stay in the mountains will learn to know themselves and others better, facing and trying to overcome their fears, binding even more between them. And together they will also overcome the tragedy - the death of Enrico during a climb - which troubles the adventure and loosens the bond around the group, so as to arrive united at the end of that summer, after which nothing will be never again as before.

Cast 
 
 Natalia Piatti as Martina
 Marco Velluti as  Lorenzo
 Federico Battilocchio as  Cesare, aka Fava
 Nicola Cipolla as  Max
 Laura Chiatti as  Giulia
 Marco Casu as  Enrico
 Francesco Salvi as Enrico's Father
 Lunetta Savino as  Cesare's Mother
 Emanuela Grimalda as  Martina's Mother
 Pino Quartullo as Lorenzo's Father
 Mariella Valentini as  Giulia's Mother
 Lidia Broccolino as  Max's Mother
 Marco Gambino as  Max's Father
 Fabio Sartor as Giulia's Father

See also  
 List of Italian films of 2005

References

External links

2005 films
2000s coming-of-age drama films
Italian coming-of-age drama films
Films directed by Giacomo Campiotti
2005 drama films
2000s Italian films
2000s Italian-language films